WVUS is a Catholic Religious formatted broadcast radio station licensed to Grafton, West Virginia, serving Grafton and Taylor County, West Virginia.  WVUS is owned and operated by Light of Life Community, Inc.

WVUS operates on a frequency of 1190 kHz, a United States and Mexican clear-channel frequency.  WVUS must leave the air from sunset to sunrise to prevent nighttime skywave interference to the Class A stations.

History
WVUS began broadcasting as WVVW in 1948.  The station switched calls to WKGA in July 1982.

WVUS would become country formatted WTBZ and begin simulcasting then co-owned WTBZ-FM (now WKTZ-FM).

In August 2002, WTBZ-FM was sold to Educational Media Foundation (becoming a K-LOVE affiliate), while WTBZ dropped country for a Rhythmic Contemporary Hit Radio format.

On May 6, 2008, WTBZ became WVUS in the first step as becoming a "new station".  Then owner Appalachian Radio filed an application to move the station from AM 1260 to AM 1190 and increase the station's daytime power to 4,500 watts.

On August 8, 2008, WVUS officially began broadcasting on AM 1190.

It was announced on November 6, 2009 that owner Steven Tocco was attempting to sell the station at an asking price of $59,000. Tocco cited low ad revenue and high operating costs as reasons for the sale, and gave a shutdown date of December 31. On December 23, 2009, WVUS was sold to Light of Life Community, Inc. for $62,550.

On March 8, 2010, WVUS dropped its Adult Standards format for Catholic Religious programming.

See also
 WVVW history page with photos

References

External links
 Light of Life Ministry Online
 

VUS